Wilson is a town in Sheboygan County, Wisconsin, United States. The population was 3,227 at the 2000 census. The unincorporated community of Weedens is located in the town. It is included in the Sheboygan, Wisconsin Metropolitan Statistical Area.

Geography
According to the United States Census Bureau, the town has a total area of 22.9 square miles (59.4 km2), of which, 22.9 square miles (59.3 km2) of it is land and 0.04 square miles (0.1 km2) of it (0.17%) is water.

Demographics
As of the census of 2000, there were 3,227 people, 1,235 households, and 974 families residing in the town. The population density was 141.0 people per square mile (54.5/km2). There were 1,323 housing units at an average density of 57.8 per square mile (22.3/km2). The racial makeup of the town was 96.81% White, 0.22% African American, 0.15% Native American, 1.36% Asian, 0.84% from other races, and 0.62% from two or more races. Hispanic or Latino of any race were 2.32% of the population.

There were 1,235 households, out of which 31.8% had children under the age of 18 living with them, 72.1% were married couples living together, 4.3% had a female householder with no husband present, and 21.1% were non-families. 18.3% of all households were made up of individuals, and 7.5% had someone living alone who was 65 years of age or older. The average household size was 2.59 and the average family size was 2.94.

In the town, the population was spread out, with 24.4% under the age of 18, 5.7% from 18 to 24, 27.1% from 25 to 44, 30.3% from 45 to 64, and 12.5% who were 65 years of age or older. The median age was 42 years. For every 100 females, there were 107.8 males. For every 100 females age 18 and over, there were 104.9 males.

The median income for a household in the town was $59,241, and the median income for a family was $63,523. Males had a median income of $46,091 versus $26,172 for females. The per capita income for the town was $27,798. About 2.1% of families and 2.5% of the population were below the poverty line, including 3.0% of those under age 18 and none of those age 65 or over.

Government
The Black River Fire Department provides fire suppression to the town. Law enforcement services are provided by the Sheboygan County Sheriff's Office. A part-time town constable is employed to address parking and ordinance concerns.

Places
Kohler-Andrae State Park is located in the southern part of the town. The James Tellen Woodland Sculpture Garden is located on Evergreen Drive. The site, cared for by the John Michael Kohler Arts Center, is dotted with sculptures connected by a woodland path. Sheboygan Indian Mound Park contains effigy mounds. The park is owned and operated by the city of Sheboygan, but completely surrounded by the town.

Notable people

 George W. Weeden, Wisconsin State Representative, lived in the town
 Joseph Wolfinger, Wisconsin State Representative, was born in the town

Images

See also
 List of towns in Wisconsin

References

External links

 

Towns in Sheboygan County, Wisconsin
Towns in Wisconsin